Woodlyn or Williamsport Station is an unincorporated community in Pickaway County, in the U.S. state of Ohio.

History
A post office called Woodlyn was established in 1882, and remained in operation until 1906. Besides the post office, Woodlyn had a railroad station and grain elevator.

References

Unincorporated communities in Pickaway County, Ohio
Unincorporated communities in Ohio